Charles Robert Rutkowski (January 17, 1938 – July 19, 2013) was a player in the American Football League for the Buffalo Bills in 1960 and the 1961 Boston (now New England) Patriots as a defensive end. He played at the collegiate level at Ripon College.

Biography
Rutkowski was born on January 17, 1938, in Racine, Wisconsin. He died July 19, 2013 in Middleton, Wisconsin. Rutkowski taught school and coached football and wrestling at Round Lake, Ill.. and coached football and boys track at McHenry, Ill., before coaching football and girls track for 32 years at Valders High School. The girls track team won 13 Olympian Conference Championships under Rutkowski. Players affectionately called him "Coach R."

See also
List of Buffalo Bills players

References

1938 births
2013 deaths
American football defensive ends
American Football League players
Buffalo Bills players
High school football coaches in Illinois
High school wrestling coaches in the United States
New England Patriots players
Players of American football from Wisconsin
Ripon Red Hawks football players
Sportspeople from Racine, Wisconsin